The .255 Jeffery Rook, also known as the .255 Jeffery Rook Rifle, is an obsolete small bore firearm cartridge.

Overview
The .255 Jeffery Rook is a rimmed centerfire cartridge.

The .255 Jeffery Rook was developed by W.J. Jeffery & Co and originally designed for use in rook rifles for hunting small game and target shooting.  It gained an excellent reputation for accuracy and was widely used for target shooting before being superseded by the .22 Long Rifle as a miniature target round, and it was also chambered in some single-shot pistols.

Major Percy Powell-Cotton carried a W.J. Jeffery & Co rook rifle chambered in .255 Jeffery Rook on a number of his expeditions stating it "is often better than the shot-gun for collecting specimens and providing for the pot."

Dimensions

See also
Rook rifle
List of rifle cartridges
6 mm rifle cartridges

References

External links

 Cartridgecollector, ".255 Jeffery Rook", cartridgecollector.net, retrieved 18 April 2017.
 The Spanish Association of Cartridge Collectors, ".246 Purdey Nitro Express", municion.org , retrieved 18 April 2017.

Pistol and rifle cartridges
British firearm cartridges
W.J. Jeffery & Co cartridges
Rook rifle cartridges